Cardiff is a  hamlet in Onondaga County, New York, United States, located south of Syracuse. It was named after Cardiff, the capital of Wales.

It was the site of the William C. "Stub" Newell farm where the "Cardiff Giant", a famous hoax, was "discovered" on October 16, 1869.

References

Syracuse metropolitan area
Hamlets in Onondaga County, New York
Hamlets in New York (state)